The Wagner Line is a defense line built in eastern Ukraine by the Wagner paramilitary group during the Russo-Ukrainian War.

Context 
On , Evgeny Prigojin, the leader of the paramilitary group Wagner, announced that he had begun the construction of a defense line.

According to the Russian media, it is a "second line of defence in case the Ukrainian armed forces try to penetrate the area.

In a report dated , the British Ministry of Defence considered that Moscow prioritized the construction of defensive positions on the Svatove-Kreminna line.

Structure 
The line consists of two double rows of pyramidal concrete blocks called "dragon's teeth" to block the tanks.

Between these two defensive curtains, a deep trench and firing stations complete the device. It is not known whether the line has mines.

The project foresees about 200 km of fortifications in eastern Ukraine, up to the Russian border. The line shall extend on a south-north axis starting from the city of Svitlodarsk, along the front line to the Donets River, and then form an acute angle again eastwards, following the course of the river to the border.

Andrey Bogatov, another leader of the Wagner Group, said that construction of the line had also begun in Belgorod Oblast, Russia.

Efficiency 
Several experts questioned the efficiency of the line.

For Xavier Tytelman, a conflict observer and defence consultant, "The dragon's teeth should be partially buried so that only the tip can pass through. A simple armoured bulldozer is enough to turn them over".

According to the Ukrainian Governor of Luhansk Region, Sergey Gaidai, only 2 km have been built to date. The ABC News considers -through the study of satellite photos - that 12 km have been built.

According to the ISW, Prigozhin’s proposed extension of the Wagner Line is intended to defend the border between Belgorod Oblast and the Ukrainian oblasts of Sumy, Kharkiv and Luhansk, but “would not cover the northern part of Luhansk Oblast up to the line of contact with the occupied territories, thus contradicting the Kremlin’s promises to defend the entire Luhansk region”.

Dragon teeth are not buried or camouflaged, which, according to a BBC article, severely limits their effectiveness.

It may also be noted that the line does not protect the city of Severodonetsk. The local authorities in Belgorod have already asked the Wagner Group to stop the construction of the trenches.

Defense Express journalists have also suggested that the construction of the line could be a money laundering operation.

References 

21st-century fortifications
Wagner Group